In theatre, a lighting designer (or LD) works with the director, choreographer, set designer, costume designer, and sound designer to create the lighting, atmosphere, and time of day for the production in response to the text while keeping in mind issues of visibility, safety, and cost. The LD also works closely with the stage manager or show control programming, if show control systems are used in that production. Outside stage lighting, the job of a lighting designer can be much more diverse, and they can be found working on rock and pop tours, corporate launches, art installations, or lighting effects at sporting events.

During pre-production
The role of the lighting designer varies greatly within professional and amateur theater. For a Broadway show, a touring production and most regional and small productions the LD is usually an outside freelance specialist hired early in the production process.  Smaller theater companies may have a resident lighting designer responsible for most of the company's productions or rely on a variety of freelance or even volunteer help to light their productions. At the off-Broadway or off-off-Broadway level, the LD will occasionally be responsible for much of the hands-on technical work (such as hanging instruments, programming the light board, etc.) that would be the work of the lighting crew in a larger theater.

The LD will read the script carefully and make notes on changes in place and time between scene—and will have meetings (called design or production meetings) with the director, designers, stage manager, and production manager to discuss ideas for the show and establish budget and scheduling details.  The LD will also attend several later rehearsals to observe the way the actors are being directed to use the stage area  ('blocking') during different scenes and will receive updates from the stage manager on any changes that occur.  The LD will also make sure that they have an accurate plan of the theatre's lighting positions and a list of their equipment, as well as an accurate copy of the set design, especially the ground plan and section. The LD must take into account the show's mood and the director's vision in creating a lighting design.

To help the LD communicate artistic vision, they may employ renderings, storyboards, photographs, reproductions of artwork, or mockups of effects to help communicate how the lighting should look. Various forms of paperwork are essential for the LD to successfully communicate their design to various members of the production team.  Examples of typical paperwork include cue sheets, light plots, instrument schedules, shop orders, and focus charts. Cue sheets communicate the placement of cues that the LD has created for the show, using artistic terminology rather than technical language, and information on exactly when each cue is called so that the stage manager and the assistants know when and where to call the cue. Cue sheets are of the most value to stage management.

The light plot is a scale drawing that communicates the location of lighting fixtures and lighting positions so a team of electricians can independently install the lighting system.   Next to each instrument on the plan will be information for any color gel, gobo, or other accessories that need to go with it, and its channel number. Often, paperwork listing all of this information is also generated by using a program such as Lightwright. The lighting designer uses this paperwork to aid in the visualization of not only ideas but also simple lists to assist the master electrician during load-in, focus, and technical rehearsals. Professional LDs generally use special computer-aided design packages to create accurate and easily readable drafted plots that can be swiftly updated as necessary.  The LD will discuss the plot with the show's production manager and the theatre's master electrician or technical director to make sure there are no unforeseen problems during load-in.

The lighting designer is responsible, in conjunction with the production's independently hired production electrician, who will interface with the theater's master electrician, for directing the theater's electrics crew in the realization of their designs during the technical rehearsals. After the Electricians have hung, circuited, and patched the lighting units, the LD will direct the focusing (pointing, shaping and sizing of the light beams) and gelling (coloring) of each unit.

After focus has occurred the LD usually sits at a temporary desk (tech table) in the theater (typically on the center line in the middle of the house) where they have a good view of the stage and work with the light board operator, who will either be seated alongside them at a portable control console or talk via headset to the control room.  At the tech table, the LD will generally use a Magic Sheet, which is a pictorial layout of how the lights relate to the stage, so they can have quick access to channel numbers that control particular lighting instruments. The LD may also have a copy of the light plot and channel hookup, a remote lighting console, a computer monitor connected to the light board (so they can see what the board op is doing), and a headset, though in smaller theatres this is less common.  There may be a period of time allowed for pre-lighting or "pre-cueing", a practice that is often done with people known as Light Walkers who stand in for performers so the LD can see what the light looks like on bodies.  At an arranged time, the performers arrive and the production is worked through in chronological order, with occasional stops to correct sound, lighting, entrances, etc.; known as a "cue-to-cue" or tech rehearsal. The lighting designer will work constantly with the board operator to refine the lighting states as the technical rehearsal continues, but because the focus of a "tech" rehearsal is the production's technical aspects, the LD may require the performers to pause ("hold") frequently. Nevertheless, any errors of focusing or changes to the lighting plan are corrected only when the performers are not onstage.  These changes take place during 'work' or 'note' calls.  The LD only attends these notes calls if units are hung or rehung and require additional focusing.  The LD or Assistant Lighting Director (also known as the ALD, see below for description) will be in charge if in attendance.  If the only work to be done is maintenance (i.e. changing a lamp or burnt out gel) then the Production or Master Electrician will be in charge and will direct the electrics crew.

After the tech process, the performance may (or may not, depending on time constraints) go into dress rehearsal without a ticketed audience or previews with a ticketed audience.  During this time, if the cueing is finished, the LD will sit in the audience and take notes on what works and what needs changing.  At this point, the stage manager will begin to take over the work of calling cues for the light board op to follow.  Generally, the LD will stay on the headset, and may still have a monitor connected to the light board in case of problems, or will be in the control booth with the board operator when a monitor is not available.  Often, changes will take place during notes call, but if serious problems occur the performance may be halted and the issue will be resolved then.

Once the show is open to the public, the lighting designer will often stay and watch several performances of the show, making notes each night and making desired changes the next day during notes call. If the show is still in previews, then the LD will make changes, but once the production officially opens, normally, the lighting designer will not make further changes.

Changes should not be made after the lighting design is finished, and never without the LD's approval.  There may be times when changes are necessary after the production has officially opened.  Reasons for changes after opening night include: casting changes; significant changes in blocking; addition, deletion or rearrangement of scenes; or the tech and/or preview period (if there was a preview period) was too short to accommodate as thorough a cueing as was needed (this is particularly common in dance productions).  If significant changes need to be made, the LD will come in and make them, however, if only smaller changes are needed, the LD may opt to send the ALD.  If a show runs for a particularly long time then the LD may come in periodically to check the focus of each lighting instrument and if they are retaining their color (some gel, especially saturated gel, loses its richness and can fade or 'burn out' over time).  The LD may also sit in on a performance to make sure that the cues are still being called at the right place and time.  The goal is often to finish by the opening of the show, but what is most important is that the LD and the directors believe that the design is finished to each's satisfaction. If that happens to be by opening night, then after opening no changes are normally made to that particular production run at that venue.  The general maintenance of the lighting rig then becomes the responsibility of the Master Electrician.

In small theatres
It is uncommon for a small theatre to have a very large technical crew, as there is less work to do. Many times, the lighting crew of a small theater will consist of a single lighting designer and one to three people, who collectively are in charge of hanging, focusing, and patching all lighting instruments. The lighting designer, in this situation, commonly works directly with this small team, fulfilling the role of both master electrician and lighting designer. Many times the designer will directly participate in the focusing of lights.  The same crew will generally also program cues and operate the light board during rehearsals and performances.  In some cases, the light board and sound board are operated by the same person, depending on the complexity of the show. The lighting designer may also take on other roles in addition to lights when they are finished hanging lights and programming cues on the board.

Advances in visualization and presentation
As previously mentioned, it is difficult to fully communicate the intent of a lighting design before all the lights are installed and all the cues are written. With the advancement in computer processing and visualization software, lighting designers are now able to create computer-generated images (CGI) that represent their ideas. The lighting designer enters the light plot into the visualization software and then enters the ground plan of the theater and set design, giving as much three-dimensional data as possible (which helps in creating complete renderings). This creates a 3D model in computer space that can be lit and manipulated.  Using the software, the LD can use the lights from his plot to create actual lighting in the 3D model with the ability to define parameters such as color, focus, gobo, beam angle etc.  The designer can then take renderings or "snapshots" of various looks that can then be printed out and shown to the director and other members of the design team.

Mockups and lighting scale models
In addition to computer visualization, either full-scale or small-scale mockups are a good method for depicting a lighting designer's ideas.  Fiber optic systems such as  LightBox or Luxam allow a users to light a scale model of the set. For example, a set designer can create a model of the set in 1/4" scale, and the lighting designer can then take the fiber optic cables and attach them to scaled-down lighting units that can accurately replicate the beam angles of specified lighting fixtures. These 'mini lights' can then be attached to cross pieces simulating different lighting positions.  Fiber optic fixtures have the capacity to simulate attributes of full scale theatrical lighting fixtures including; color, beam angle, intensity, and gobos.  The most sophisticated  fiber optic systems are controllable through computer software or a DMX controlled Light board. This gives the lighting designer the ability to mock up real-time lighting effects as they will look during the show.

Additional members of the lighting design team
If the production is large or especially complex, the lighting designer may hire additional lighting professionals to help execute the design.

Associate lighting designer
The associate lighting designer (associate LD) will assist the lighting designer in creating and executing the lighting design. While the duties that an LD may expect the associate LD to perform may differ from person to person, usually the Ass't LD will do the following:
 Attend design and production meetings with or in place of the LD
 Attend rehearsals with or in place of LD and take notes of specific design ideas and tasks that the lighting department needs to accomplish
 Assist the LD in generating the light plot, channel hookup and sketches
 If needed, the Associate may need to take the set drawings and put them into a CAD program to be manipulated by the LD (however, this job is usually given to the assistant LD if there is one).
 The assistant LD may be in charge of running focus, and may even direct where the lights are to be focused.
 The associate is generally authorized to speak on behalf of the LD and can make creative and design decisions when needed (and when authorized by the LD).  This is one of the biggest differences between the Associate and the Assistant.

Assistant lighting designer
The assistant lighting designer (assistant LD) assists the lighting designer and associate lighting designer. Depending on the particular arrangement the ALD may report directly to the LD, or they may in essence be the Associate's assistant.  There also may be more than one assistant on a show depending on the size of the production.  The ALD will usually:
 Attend design and production meetings with the LD or the associate LD
 Attend rehearsals with the LD or the associate LD
 Assist the LD in generating the light plot and channel hookup.  If the plot is to be computer generated, the ALD is the one who physically enters the information into the computer.
 The ALD may run errands for the LD such as picking up supplies or getting the light plot printed in large format.
 The ALD will help the Associate LD in running focus.
 The ALD may take Focus Charts during focus.
 Track and coordinate followspots (if any exist for the production) and generate paperwork to aid in their cueing and color changes.
 In rare instances the ALD may be the light board operator.

See also

 List of lighting designers
 Architectural lighting design
 Landscape lighting
 Master Electrician
 PLASA

References

 Stage Lighting Design: The Art, the Craft, the Life, by Richard Pilbrow on books.google.com
 Stage Lighting Design: A Practical Guide,  Neil Fraser, on books.google.com
 A Practical Guide to Stage Lighting, By Steven Louis Shelley, on books.google.com 
 The Lighting Art: The Aesthetics of Stage Lighting Design, by Richard H. Palmer, on books.google.com
 Stage lighting design in Britain: the emergence of the lighting designer, 1881-1950, by Nigel H. Morgan, on books.google.com
 Scene Design and Stage Lighting By R. Wolf, Dick Block, on books.google.com

External links 
 stagelightingprimer.com,Stage Lighting for Students
 northern.edu, A brief history of stage lighting

 
 
Broadcasting occupations
Design occupations
Filmmaking occupations
Landscape or garden designers
Mass media occupations
Television terminology
Theatrical occupations
Stage crew
Stage lighting

sv:Ljusdesign#Ljusdesigner